Ethiopia competed at the 1968 Summer Olympics in Mexico City, Mexico. 18 competitors, all men, took part in 13 events in 3 sports.

Medalists

Gold
 Mamo Wolde — Athletics, men's marathon

Silver
 Mamo Wolde — Athletics, men's 10000 metres

Athletics

Boxing

Cycling

Five cyclists represented Ethiopia in 1968.

Individual road race
 Tekeste Woldu
 Yemane Negassi
 Mehari Okubamicael
 Mikael Saglimbeni

Team time trial
 Yemane Negassi
 Fisihasion Ghebreyesus
 Mikael Saglimbeni
 Tekeste Woldu

References

External links
Official Olympic Reports
International Olympic Committee results database

1968 in Ethiopian sport
Nations at the 1968 Summer Olympics
1968 Summer Olympics